The Land, irrigated hieroglyph ("sectioned land", Gardiner  N24)
represents  "district, nome" (phonetic value sp3t). It is a determinative in the name of provinces and regions in the noun ḥsp, for "garden", "vegetable garden", and "orchard".

See also

Gardiner's Sign List#N. Sky, Earth, Water
List of Egyptian hieroglyphs
Arm, cubit symbol (hieroglyph)

References

Betrò, 1995. Hieroglyphics: The Writings of Ancient Egypt, Betrò, Maria Carmela, c. 1995, 1996-(English), Abbeville Press Publishers, New York, London, Paris (hardcover, 
Budge, (1920), 1978.  An Egyptian Hieroglyphic Dictionary, E.A.Wallace Budge, (Dover Publications), c 1978, (c 1920), Dover edition, 1978. (In two volumes, 1314 pp. and cliv-(154) pp.) (softcover)
Egyptian hieroglyphs: sky-earth-water